DeVotchKa is an American four-piece multi-instrumental and vocal ensemble. They take their name from the Russian word devochka (девочка), meaning "girl". Based in Denver, Colorado, the quartet is made up of Nick Urata, who sings and plays theremin, guitar, bouzouki, piano, and trumpet; Tom Hagerman, who plays violin, accordion, and piano; Jeanie Schroder, who sings and plays sousaphone, double bass, and flute; and Shawn King, who plays percussion and trumpet.

History
Originally a backing band for burlesque shows, in their early years DeVotchKa also toured with burlesque performer and model Dita Von Teese. Numerous nationwide tours in support of self-released records earned the band an underground following. Their song "How It Ends" introduced the band to a wider audience after being featured in the trailer for Everything Is Illuminated, in a Gears of War 2 trailer called "The Last Day", and in an episode of Everwood. Their performance at the 2006 Bonnaroo music festival was considered a breakout event.  In between tours, the band was picked by first time film directors Jonathan Dayton and Valerie Faris to score Little Miss Sunshine, a 2006 film that would go on to garner four Academy Award nominations. DeVotchKa, along with composer Mychael Danna, composed and performed the majority of the music for the film's soundtrack and were nominated for a 2006 Grammy Award for Best Compilation Soundtrack. The main song, "The Winner Is", was also used in a commercial by the French-based environment and energy company Suez and the Dutch pension fund PGGM.

In 2006, Arcade Fire singer Win Butler suggested to DeVotchKa that they arrange the Siouxsie and the Banshees song "The Last Beat of My Heart". The musicians found the idea interesting and they recorded that song for the now critically acclaimed Curse Your Little Heart EP.
The band did a world tour in support of their previous album,  A Mad & Faithful Telling (released March 2008). The album reached No. 9 on the Billboard Heatseekers chart and No. 29 on the Top Independent Albums chart. "New World" and "Head Honcho" were featured in a season 4 episode of the Showtime television show Weeds.

In 2008, Boston newspaper The Phoenix named them the Best New Band from Colorado. "How It Ends" reached Number 101 in the UK Singles Charts.

The band supported Muse at the Stade de France on June 12, 2010, playing to over 80,000 people.

The band's newest album, This Night Falls Forever, was released on August 24, 2018, via Concord Records. On July 13, 2018, DeVotchKa released "Straight Shot", which is the first track on the album.

Members
 Nick Urata – vocals, guitars, piano, trumpet, theremin, bouzouki
 Tom Hagerman – violin, accordion, piano, Melodica
 Jeanie Schroder – sousaphone (currently), upright bass, vocals, flute
 Shawn King – drums, percussion, trumpet, accordion, organ

Discography

 SuperMelodrama (2000)
 Triple X Tango (2002)
 Una Volta (2003)
 How It Ends (2004)
 Curse Your Little Heart (EP) (2006)
 Little Miss Sunshine (soundtrack) (2006)
 A Mad & Faithful Telling (2008) No. 29 Independent Albums Chart/ No. 9 Heatseakers (Billboard U.S.)
 I Love You, Phillip Morris motion picture soundtrack (2010)
 100 Lovers (2011) No. 74 U.S.
 DeVotchKa Live with the Colorado Symphony (2012)
 This Night Falls Forever (2018)
Other album appearances
 Nightmare Revisited - "Overture" (2008)
 Live at KEXP Vol.5 - "How It Ends" (2009)
 Starbuck's Sweetheart -  "Hot Burrito No. 1" (2009)
 Songs from the Point! (Harry Nilsson cover album) - "Everything's Got 'Em" (2009)
  Minnesota Beatle Project Volume 4 - "Girl" (2011; Vega Productions. CD and LP.)
 "Man in a Shoe" - DirecTV ad using "The Winner Is", NBC, (2013)

References

External links

DeVotchKa at Ace Fu Records
DeVotchka interview, and performance with Urata and Hagerman, for The Current
Mikel Jollett of Filter magazine reviews the CD How It Ends on NPR's "All Things Considered"
Soundcrank Podcast Hosted by Shawn King
Devotchka, Artistas Destacados - Billboard En Español
 

Dark cabaret musicians
Gypsy punk groups
Indie rock musical groups from Colorado
Musical groups from Denver
Musical groups established in 1997
Musical quartets
Anti- (record label) artists
Concord Records artists